Alberto Pizzo (Naples, March 13, 1980) is an Italian pianist and composer.

Biography 
He started studying piano as a young man, and in 2004 he graduated at the San Pietro a Majella conservatoire in Naples.

He played the music for a show about Vincenzo Bellini broadcast on Rai International and in the same year he wrote and performed the music for Geo & Geo, on Rai Tre. His first album was titled Funambulist, produced by Cinevox Record.

His second album was titled On The Way and included collaborations with several artists, including Mino Cinelu, Toquinho, Renzo Arbore and David Knopfler.

In 2014 Alberto Pizzo performed with Luis Bacalov and Stefano Bollani in the concert “3 Piano Generations” and became an Official Yamaha Artist, joining Yamaha artists network. On September 4 he performed in Ravello in a piano solo concert as part of the Ravello Festival, where he had already played in 2013. In November 2014 he worked as musical director and pianist at Teatro Diana in Naples, for the show La sciantosa with Serena Autieri.

In 2015 he performed at the Festival dei due mondi in Spoleto in the concert “3 Piano Generations”, along with Luis Bacalov and Rita Marcotulli.

In November 2015 he signed with Sony Classical label, which released the album Memories, recorded at Abbey Road Studios in London, with the participation of the London Symphony Orchestra and Luis Bacalov as orchestrator and musical director.

Discography 
 Funambulist - 2012
 On the Way - 2014
 Memories - 2016

References

Notes 
 Antonio Lodetti, Lace, pianist like VIPs, ilgiornale.it, July 6, 2014.
 The Mediterranean music according to the notes of Alberto Pizzo, ilmattino.it, October 8, 2014.
 Lorenza Cerbini, "On The Way". Interview with Alberto Pizzo, americaoggi.info, February 23, 2014.
 Alberto Pizzo Official becomes Yamaha Artist, it.notizie.yahoo.com, May 19, 2015.

External links
Official site, albertopizzo.com.

1980 births
Italian male pianists
Italian male composers
Living people
21st-century pianists
21st-century Italian male musicians